The Upper Mississippian cultures were located in the Upper Mississippi basin and Great Lakes region of the American Midwest.  They were in existence from approximately A.D. 1000 until the Protohistoric and early Historic periods (approximately A.D. 1700).

Archaeologists generally consider "Upper Mississippian" to be an attenuated version of "Middle Mississippian" cultures represented at Cahokia and other sites exhibiting a higher level of culture, perhaps at a chiefdom level of development.  The Middle Mississippians were capable of forming large cities and were thus heavily dependent on agriculture to support large populations.  This civilization had its origins about A.D. 1000 or slightly earlier, and was at its peak in the 12th and 13th centuries A.D. when the population at Cahokia was estimated to be 40,000 and the city itself covered an area of 3,480 acres (in contrast, Upper Mississippian sites are usually well under 10 acres).  Although the Middle Mississippian declined after its peak, there were still advanced chiefdom-level societies present at the time of the DeSoto expedition in the 1530s and 1540s.

The Upper Mississippians had their origins about the same time as the Middle Mississippians, around A.D. 1000.  They attained larger populations and heavier emphasis on agriculture than the previous Late Woodland cultures but still relied to a large extent on hunting and gathering and lacked the chiefdom-level form of society and the large centralized cities.  The Late Woodland peoples with their emphasis on small villages and hunting and gathering adaptation had previously occupied the Upper Mississippi Valley and Great Lakes Region prior to A.D. 1000.  In some areas, the Late Woodland population persisted until European contact, and even occasionally coexisted in the same time and place with the Upper Mississippians.

Most of the Upper Mississippian entities are grouped together under the Oneota aspect.  The Grand River, Lake Winnebago, Koshkonong, Green Bay (aka Mero Complex), Orr and Utz are Foci grouped under Oneota.  Fisher and Huber are placed by James A. Brown in an "unnamed tradition" (or focus) within the Oneota aspect.  The Langford tradition is seen as contemporaneous with Fisher and Huber and is considered Upper Mississippian due to its similarity to Fisher material culture (especially pottery). The Fort Ancient Aspect in the Ohio River Valley is sometimes considered an Upper Mississippian entity.

Characteristics 

The major diagnostic trait of the Upper Mississippian cultures is their use of shell to temper their pottery, a practice which they shared in common with the Middle Mississippians.  In contrast, the Late Woodland pottery was grit-tempered up until European contact. The Langford Tradition pottery is actually grit-tempered, but is still designated as Upper Mississippian because of the stylistic similarities with Fisher Ware.

Other than the pottery, the Upper Mississippian way of life was essentially similar to that of the Late Woodland cultures.  They may have been slightly more dependent on maize agriculture, but hunting and gathering were still part of their subsistence base.

The triangular projectile points called “Madison Points” are a trait the Upper Mississippians share with the Late Woodland.  These artifacts were used for warfare, hunting and fishing, and are almost always present in large numbers at any site after A.D. 1000, usually dominating the stone tool assemblages.  It may be that this reflects increased levels of conflict during this period.

Other artifacts that are diagnostic of the Upper Mississippian cultures specifically are double-pointed biface knives, long thin ovate blades, uniface humpbacked end scrapers, expanding base drills, sandstone abraders (aka “arrowshaft straighteners”), elk or bison scapula hoes, deer metatarsal beamers, pot sherd discs that seem to have been used as spindle whorls, and antler or bone cylinders that appear to be game pieces. In 1945 WC McKern provided a list of diagnostic traits he felt represented the Upper Mississippian cultures in Wisconsin.

Origins 

The origin of the Upper Mississippian cultures is a matter of debate among archaeologists.  They may have been local Late Woodland populations who were influenced by the large-scale chiefdom entities; or they may have originated in one of these more advanced societies and set out to “colonize” the marginal areas to the north.  Aztalan is a site that represents an incursion of Middle Mississippians into Wisconsin; however, it is apparent that the Aztalan material culture is quite distinct from Upper Mississippian, so it does not necessarily follow that one evolved out of the other.  There is evidence that from A.D. 1200-1500 there was a climatic cooling trend which appears to have made the growing system much less reliable in the Upper Mississippi area.  This may have been why the culture “reverted” back to a smaller scale society with lesser dependence on agriculture for subsistence, and more emphasis on hunting and gathering.

There is significant evidence that the Middle Mississippians and Upper Mississippians had frequent contact with each other.  In particular, the Anker site near Chicago, Illinois, yielded grave goods with clear ties to the south including a mask gorget with a “weeping eye” motif which was also found on an artifact from the Nodena site in Arkansas, and is considered to be associated with the Southern Ceremonial Complex.  It is unclear whether this represents trade or an actual movement of people from the Middle Mississippian heartland to the Great Lakes.

Environment 

The Upper Mississippian sites are mostly located on what is known as the Prairie Peninsula region of the American Midwest; including the states of Iowa, Missouri, Illinois, northern Indiana and southwestern Michigan.  This was prime habitat for the bison, which comprised a major food source as well as raw material for bone tools.  Archaeologists believe that the range of the bison did not extend across the Mississippi into Illinois until about A.D. 1600.

Sites in the Prairie Peninsula are generally located in major river valleys like the Illinois or Mississippi.  These areas were ideally suited for the inhabitants to access resources in several different ecosystems; the prairie (bison, elk); river bottoms (nuts, berries, wild turkey), oak savannas (deer, elk, bear, wild berries) and the river itself with associated marshes and wetlands (fish, water lily tubers, mussels, turtles, waterfowl).

Architecture 

 
Several types of houses have been noted at Upper Mississippian sites.  At the Huber sites of Oak Forest and Anker, large oval structures measuring from 25–55 feet long and 10–15 feet wide were excavated.  At the Fisher and Zimmerman sites, square to rectangular semi-subterranean wall-trench houses were found, similar to houses at the Middle Mississippian site of Aztalan.

Forms of structures may have also changed over time.  It was thought that the square houses found at the Zimmerman site may date to an earlier time period when growing seasons were more reliable and a settled agricultural life way led to construction of more substantial structures.  Later structures at the site were much more ephemeral, and may represent temporary wigwams at a time period when growing seasons were less reliable and the hunting of bison contributed more to subsistence.  The temporary structures facilitated movement as the bison herds were followed as part of a seasonal round.

Pit features 

Most Upper Mississippian sites have large numbers of pit features which functioned as storage pits, refuse pits, roasting pits and hearths. The storage pits were thought to be constructed to help preserve food for extended periods of time; possibly through the winter, if the site is a permanent village.  As the contents of these pits soured, they were converted to refuse pits.  These pits often contain abundant information for archaeological analysis; pot sherds, lithic flakes and tools, animal bone, plant remains and occasionally even human remains.

Mortuary customs 

Some sites consist of a village area in conjunction with a cemetery.  Often the burials are interred in mounds, such as in the Fisher Mound Group and Gentleman Farm site.  Both extended burials and bundle burials are present.  Grave goods are present with some burials.  The most common artifacts included with burials are shell spoons and pottery vessels; at the Fisher Mound Group, the spoons and vessel interiors had a greasy feel, and small amounts of bone were present; implying that the pots contained food when they were buried.

A large number of burials were excavated at the Anker Site which included exceptionally rich grave goods, implying they were wealthy or of higher status.

Subsistence 

The Upper Mississippian subsistence pattern had a primary emphasis on agriculture but hunting, gathering and fishing were also of importance.  Compared to Late Woodland, the Upper Mississippian pattern tends to be more focused on efficient procurement of large-scale resources as opposed to utilizing every resource available.  Therefore, efforts were focused on maize-beans-squash agriculture and hunting of large animals such as deer, elk and bison which provide significant amounts of meat to support larger populations.

At sites where flotation techniques were used to recover small-scale plant remanis, the Eastern Agricultural Complex (EAC) of cultivated seeds such as goosefoot (Chenopodium berlandieri), little barley (Hordeum pusillum), knotweed (Polygonum) and sumpweed (Iva annua) are often present.  These seeds were first in use during Middle Woodland times and their use persisted until early Historic times.

Gathering of wild plants was still an important economic activity and at Upper Mississippian sites sampled by flotation, the remains of plants such as nutshell (hickory nut, black walnut, hazelnut and acorn), wild rice, plum, wild grape, sumac, hawthorn and other wild seeds are commonly found.

There are some sites showing evidence of focused seasonal resource exploitation of food sources such as sturgeon and water lily tubers.  Sturgeon represented a potentially large supply of food at the time they made their annual spawning run.  Specialized roasting pit features have been excavated at some sites which appear to be ethnographically documented by the early French explorers and described as “macopin roasting pits”.  The tubers of American Lotus (Nelumbo lutea) and white water lily (Nymphaea tuberosa) have been recovered from roasting pits at some sites.  At the Schwerdt and Elam sites on the Kalamazoo River in southwestern Michigan, sturgeon bone and American Lotus tubers were found together in the same roasting pits; indicating a specialized seasonal encampment.

Daily life 

The archaeological record often lacks evidence of daily activities because so much of the material culture is made of wood, fiber, plants and textiles that rarely survive for the archaeologist.  However items made of bone, stone, shell, antler and copper usually survive and offer valuable glimpses into daily life.

At any given Upper Mississippian site, on a daily basis the Native American inhabitants undertook a variety of tasks and activities.

Evidence of hunting activities is found in the chipped stone projectile points.  They were hafted to arrowshafts and used as bows-and-arrows.(Fenner 1963)  They could also be used as spear points to harvest fish.  Arrowshafts were made of small branches that were straightened using a sandstone abrader.  Bone and antler projectile points and harpoons are additional hunting and fishing implements commonly found at Upper Mississippian as well as Late Woodland sites.

The Upper Mississippians occasionally went to war, and their main weapon was the bow-and-arrow tipped with a triangular projectile point.  In the Protohistoric and early Historic periods additional artifacts such as gunflints and iron tomahawks provide evidence of conflict.

A wide variety of stone knives was used in the butchering of meat; preparation of hides; cutting fibers or ropes; processing of plant foods; or any other domestic activity requiring a sharp cutting implement.  Sometimes knives made from scapula bone are also present in the archaeological record; which may be broken hoes that have been repurposed as knives.

Hide-working required its own set of tools; knives to separate the skin from the body; beamers to de-hair the hide; scrapers to further process; drills and awls to punch holes if needed; and bone needles if sewing is required.

Woodworking tools included adzes and axes to cut the large branches or the tree itself; scrapers and knives to shape the wood into the desired shape; and drills if holes or indentations are needed.

Sewing activities utilizing bone needles took place in the manufacture of clothing and reed mats.

The manufacture of stone tools was an essential activity in a Prehistoric society.  In the archaeological record, it results in a number of waste flakes and unused “cores”.  Antler flakers and socketed antler “punches” which were used the knapping process are commonly recovered at Upper Mississippian sites.

Hoes made out of elk or bison scapula were used during agricultural activities, or just for any digging function.  They may have been used in the building of subterranean houses; in preparation for a burial; or to dig the pit features which are usually abundant at all Upper Mississippian sites: storage pits, refuse pits or roasting pits.

Daily meal preparation and serving is one of the most basic of household functions and takes place multiple times a day.  Usually this is well represented in the archaeological record in the form of cooking pots, serving instruments and animal bone.  Where flotation techniques are used, additional information may be obtained in the form of small seeds and even wood charcoal from the hearths and roasting pits.  Shell spoons used for serving implements have been found at several Upper Mississippian sites.  The cooking pots used for food cooking and storage often have encrusted food residue resulting from accidentally burning the contents.  It's been noted that shell tempering adds some efficiency to the pottery vessel by allowing for thinner walls which result in lighter weights.  Most of the Upper Mississippian pottery wares feature handles which facilitate picking up and moving the vessels.

Recreational/artistic/personal adornment/ceremonial life 

These categories are combined because in Upper Mississippian culture (and Prehistoric Native American culture in general) the boundaries between them are blurred.

The bone and antler cylinders are thought to be game pieces.  At the Fisher site, these game pieces are found in conjunction with a stone tablet which apparently taken together forms a “game set”.  It is possible that this was a gambling game, since early Native American tribes were observed to engage in gambling activities.

Bone rasps (musical instrument) have been recovered and may have been used for making music for enjoyment or as part of a ceremony.

Smoking pipes were also used for both recreational smoking and for use in a ceremony.  Generally unstemmed pipes were for recreational use and stemmed pipes such as calumets were used for ceremonies.

Many items of personal adornment have been recovered such as stone, bone and copper ornaments or pendants; bone plume holders and hair tubes made of bird bone. Some of these may have been worn on a daily basis but also may have been a part of a costume for a ceremony.  In early Historic times, sometimes Jesuit rings have been found, indicating profession of Catholic faith as a result of French missionary activities.

Works of art have been found at Upper Mississippian sites and it is probable that most of them were not looked upon simply for enjoyment or cultural appreciation, but for objects used by medicine men and/or to be used in ceremonies.  These include mask gorgets with artistic motifs, engraved pebbles, and animal or bird figurines made of bone, shell or copper.  A common artifact found in Late Prehistoric or Protohistoric components is a serpent figurine made of copper; in early Historic times these may be made from imported European copper.

In general, the prehistoric Native American religious system was based on animism and polytheism.  Objects were thought to have magical qualities; using them in ceremonies would help to appease or get the support of deities or totem animals; and putting them in graves may assist the deceased into the afterlife.  Sometimes the bones of certain totem animals such as heron, bald eagle, crane, otter, or beaver were included in the grave, possibly as part of “medicine bundles”.

Dogs were often sacrificed in order to entreat the gods prior to undertaking a difficult task or during an emergency.  Dog meat was also eaten during ceremonies, so dog bone recovered from a site generally implies a spiritual or ceremonial context.

It is also possible that certain entire sites were specialized for spiritual purposes, such as for conducting ceremonies or preparing burials for interment in a mound.

Artifacts 

Some representative artifacts of the Upper Mississippian cultures are displayed here:

Trade 

There is ample evidence that the Upper Mississippian cultures traded amongst themselves as well as other cultures across a large area of the North American continent.  The apparent connection with the Middle Mississippians has already been pointed out above; the shell gorget with “weeping-eye” motif and Middle Mississippian pottery vessels from the Anker site show a clear link to sites in Arkansas.

Copper artifacts are often found at Upper Mississippian sites.  These were apparently fashioned from the native copper located in the Upper Peninsula of Michigan.  It's unclear whether the copper was fashioned into artifacts in Michigan prior to trading to other areas, or if the Upper Mississippians traded for the raw copper and fashioned the artifacts themselves.

There are also signs of trade with the Iroquoian and Fort Ancient peoples to the east.  Iroquoian pipes, Whittlesey-style pipes and Fort Ancient-like pottery have been found at Upper Mississippian sites.

Trade between the individual Upper Mississippian tribes or populations can often be inferred through careful examination of the archaeological record.  Minority pottery types are usually present in the form of a few vessels out of a complete assemblage that are of another ware group.  Archaeologists often call these “trade vessels” but they could also result from intermarriage with neighboring tribes or other factors.  In the early Historic Period it was often reported that two or more tribes shared a village and that would also result in multiple ware groups at the same site.

Upper Mississippian traditions and pottery ware types 

Upper Mississippian pottery usually comes in the form of globular, round-bottomed vessels commonly called “jars”, with restricted orifices and vertical to flared rim profiles. The different ware styles and types are based on differences in temper (shell or grit), surface finish (plain, smooth or cordmarked) and decorative techniques which usually occur on the section of the vessel between the rim and shoulder, and on the lip.  Occasionally other vessel forms are present, such as bowls with vertical sides, or shallow pans.

Some representative complete and reconstructed Upper Mississippian vessels are illustrated below:

Some information on representative Upper Mississippian ware groups is presented in subsections below.

Huber phase (aka Blue Island) 

 Representative sites: Griesmer, Huber, Palos, Hoxie Farm, Oak Forest, Anker, Knoll Spring (Au Sagaunashke Component), Zimmerman (minority type), Moccasin Bluff (Berrien Phase Groups 1, 2 and 3), Schwerdt (Berrien Phase)
 Pottery: Huber Ware, characterized by shell-tempering, predominantly plain surfaces and linear decorations
 Radiocarbon Dates: A.D. 1520, 1530 (Griesmer), A.D. 1425-1625 (Oak Forest), A.D. 1590, 1640 (Moccasin Bluff), A.D. 1445-1450 (Schwerdt)
 Chronological trends: Early Huber is often cordmarked; has notched lips; and is decorated with medium- to wide-trailed lines.  Late Huber is almost never cordmarked; notched lips decrease in frequency; and decorations are applied in fine-trailed lines.  Huber is also thought to have derived from and/or replaced Fisher, since Fisher exhibits essentially the same traits as early Huber.
 Sites with European trade goods: Palos, Oak Forest, Hoxie Farm
 Probable Ethnic Identification: Chiwere Sioux, Winnebago or Miami

Fisher tradition 

 Representative sites: Fisher Mound Group, Griesmer, Fifield, Moccasin Bluff (Berrien phase groups 4 and 5), Hoxie Farm (minority type)
 Pottery: Fisher Ware, characterized by shell-tempering, cordmarked surfaces and curvilinear decorations; lips are often notched
 Radiocarbon Dates: A.D. 1520, 1530 (Griesmer)
 Sites with European trade goods: Hoxie Farm
 Probable Ethnic Identification: Algonquian-speaking tribe

Langford tradition 

 Representative sites: Fisher Mound Group, Zimmerman (Heally Complex), Hotel Plaza (Upper Mississippian component), Gentleman Farm
 Pottery: Langford Ware, characterized by grit-tempering, cordmarked and smoothed surfaces, and curvilinear decorations
 Radiocarbon Dates: A.D. 1630 (Zimmerman)
 Sites with European trade goods: none
 Probable Ethnic Identification: Illinois or Kaskaskia

Grand River focus 

 Representative sites: Carcajou Point, Walker-Hooper
 Pottery: Grand River Ware, characterized by shell-tempered pottery with smooth surface and curvilinear decorations
 Radiocarbon Dates: A.D. 998-1528
 Sites with European trade goods: Carcajou Point
 Probable Ethnic Identification: Winnebago or Chiwere Sioux

Koshkonong focus 

 Representative sites: Carcajou Point, Summer Island (Upper Mississippian component)
 Pottery: Koshkonong Ware and Carcajou Ware, characterized by shell-tempered pottery with smooth surface and curvilinear decorations
 Radiocarbon Dates: A.D. 998-1528
 Sites with European trade goods: Carcajou Point
 Probable Ethnic Identification: Winnebago or Chiwere Sioux

Orr focus 

 Representative sites: Upper Iowa River Oneota site complex, Shrake-Gillies, Midway and Pammel Creek
 Pottery: Allamakee trailed
 Radiocarbon dates: A.D. 1426-1660
 Sites with European trade goods: Upper Iowa River Oneota site complex
 Probable ethnic identification: Ioway and Otoe

Green Bay focus (aka Mero complex) 

 Representative sites: Mero
 Pottery: large proportion of grit-tempered pottery; handles and decoration are rare; related to Grand River focus
 Radiocarbon dates: none, but dated to A.D. 1200-1400 based on the artifacts present
 Sites with European trade goods: none
 Probable Ethnic Affiliation: unknown

See also
 Mississippi Valley: Culture, phase, and chronological periods table - List of archaeological periods
 List of Mississippian sites

References

Further reading

.
.
.
Mound builders (people)
Archaeological cultures of North America
Formative period in the Americas
Native American history
Native American history of Michigan
Native American history of Minnesota
Native American history of Wisconsin
Native American history of Illinois
Native American history of Missouri
Native American history of Indiana
Native American history of Iowa
Prehistoric cultures in Ohio
Illinois Confederation
Ho-Chunk
Miami tribe
Siouan peoples
Late Prehistoric period of North America